This is a list of electoral results for the electoral district of Ormond in Victorian state elections.

Members for Ormond

Election results

Elections in the 1960s

Elections in the 1950s

References

Victoria (Australia) state electoral results by district